The Ghana women's national volleyball team represents Ghana in international women's volleyball competitions and friendly matches.

Its best result was 4th place at the 1991 Women's African Volleyball Championship.

References
Ghana Volleyball Federation

National women's volleyball teams
Volleyball
Volleyball in Ghana
Women's sport in Ghana